István Dégi (born Makó, August 21, 1935 - died Budapest, November 8, 1992) was a Hungarian actor.

Partial filmography

 Szerelem csütörtök (1959)
 Gyalog a mennyországba (1959)
 Égrenyíló ablak (1960) - Nagyfülü
 Sikátor (1967) - Tóth Feri
 Lássátok feleim (1968) - Juhász szobrász
 Fiúk a térröl (1968) - Vallató
 Sziget a szárazföldön (1969) - Fiatal férj
 Imposztorok (1969) - Angelicus páter
 The Toth Family (1969) - Gyuri, a postás
 Krebsz, az isten (1970) - A központ munkatársa
 Utazás a koponyám körül (1970) - Író
 N.N. a halál angyala (1970) - Vári Elemér, fõhadnagy
 Szép magyar komédia (1970)
 Derzhis za oblaka (1971) - Börtönpap
 A halhatatlan légiós (1971) - Kratochwill
 Hahó, Öcsi! (1971) - III. Bölcs
 Hekus lettem (1972) - Payer Henrik
 A völegény nyolckor érkezik (1972) - Géza
 A magyar ugaron (1973) - Nyomozó
 Kakuk Marci (1973) - Csurinyák Ferenc
 Jelbeszéd (1974) - Varga
 Tükörképek (1976) - Egy ápolt
 The Fifth Seal (1976) - Keszei Károly
 Tótágas (1976) - Szülõ
 A kard (1977) - Szakértõ
 A csillagszemü (1977) - Orbán
 Amerikai cigaretta (1978) - Szerkesztõségi tag
 Kojak Budapesten (1980)
 Rohanj velem! (1982) - Karcsi bácsi, a pszichológus
 Macbeth (1983, TV Movie)
 Vérszerzödés (1983) - Kukler százados
 Az utolsó futam (1983) - Tojásos Frédi
 Az óriás (1984)
 A nagy generáció (1986)
 Akli Miklós (1986) - Assailant
 Elysium (1987)
 Szamárköhögés (1987) - Pedellus
 Küldetés Evianba (1988) - Steiner
 Hanussen (1988)
 Paths of Death and Angels (1991) - Árpi
 Erózió (1992) - Nagyapa
 Bolse vita (1996) - (final film role)

External links

1935 births
1992 deaths
Hungarian male film actors
20th-century Hungarian male actors
1992 suicides
Suicides in Hungary